The ALCO RSD-5 is a diesel-electric locomotive rated at , that rode on a pair of three-axle trucks, having a C-C wheel arrangement.

Basically an upgraded version of the earlier ALCO RSD-4, and used in much the same manner as its four-axle counterpart, the ALCO RS-3, the six-motor design allowed better tractive effort at lower speeds.

Original owners

Preserved units
As of 2015, there are only two of these (unrebuilt) locomotives known to be in existence. Ex-CNW #1689, formerly owned by Gary Baloun, is currently in operation at the Illinois Railway Museum and repainted in its original Chicago & North Western colors. The other is the former Utah Railway #306, now painted as Nickel Plate Road #324 and formerly owned by Doyle McCormack of the Oregon Rail Heritage Foundation. As of September 2022, the locomotive has been repatriated to Utah and is located at the Utah State Railroad Museum awaiting a planned restoration to its Utah Railway colors.

Two rebuilt RSD5s (made into RSD-12's) built for the Southern Pacific survive at the Orange Empire Railway Museum (numbers 2954 and 2958).

References

C-C locomotives
RSD-5
Diesel-electric locomotives of the United States
Railway locomotives introduced in 1952
Standard gauge locomotives of the United States
Standard gauge locomotives of Mexico